Marcos Díaz may refer to:

 Marcos Díaz (footballer), Argentine footballer
 Marcos Díaz (swimmer), Dominican swimmer

See also 
 Marco Diaz (disambiguation)